Jake Dalton Barrett (born July 22, 1991) is an American professional baseball pitcher for the Acereros de Monclova of the Mexican League. He previously played in Major League Baseball (MLB) for the Arizona Diamondbacks and New York Yankees. He played college baseball for Arizona State University.

Amateur career
Barrett began playing baseball when he was 10 years old. He attended Desert Ridge High School in Mesa, Arizona, and played for the school's baseball team. As a junior, he was named All-State. After the season, he played for the United States national baseball team in the 2008 World Junior Baseball Championship.

The Toronto Blue Jays selected Barrett in the third round of the 2009 MLB Draft, but he did not sign. He enrolled at Arizona State University, and played college baseball for the Arizona State Sun Devils baseball team. In 2010, he played collegiate summer baseball with the Brewster Whitecaps of the Cape Cod Baseball League.

Professional career

Arizona Diamondbacks
The Arizona Diamondbacks chose Barrett in the third round of the 2012 MLB Draft. He signed and played for the South Bend Silver Hawks of the Class A Midwest League in 2012, and the Visalia Rawhide of the Class A-Advanced California League and Mobile BayBears of the Class AA Southern League in 2013. After the 2013 season, the Diamondbacks assigned him to the Salt River Rafters of the Arizona Fall League (AFL), and he appeared in the AFL Fall Stars Game. He pitched for Mobile and the Reno Aces of the Class AAA Pacific Coast League in 2014, where he had a combined 3.09 earned run average. He pitched for Mobile and Reno again in 2015. The Diamondbacks added him to their 40-man roster after the season.

Barrett was chosen for the United States national baseball team's roster for the 2015 Pan American Games.

He made his MLB debut with the Diamondbacks on April 4, 2016. In 68 games, Barrett posted an ERA of 3.49 with 4 saves. The following two seasons, Barrett has struggled with consistency and injury, being limited to 35 total appearances between 2017 and 2018.

San Francisco Giants
Barrett was designated for assignment by the Diamondbacks on January 31, 2019, after the signing of Greg Holland was made official. The Diamondbacks traded him to the San Francisco Giants for cash considerations on February 5. He was then designated for assignment again on February 22.

Pittsburgh Pirates
On March 1, Barrett was claimed off waivers by the Pittsburgh Pirates and added to their 40-man roster. Barrett was designated for assignment on March 28, 2019, after the contracts of J. B. Shuck, Melky Cabrera, and Francisco Liriano were selected.

New York Yankees
On April 4, 2019, the New York Yankees claimed Barrett off of waivers. On May 4, he was recalled from the Class AAA affiliate of the Yankees, the Scranton/Wilkes-Barre Railriders to replace James Paxton. Barrett was outrighted off the Yankees roster on November 4 and became a free agent.

Acereros de Monclova
On April 9, 2020, Barrett signed with the Acereros de Monclova of the Mexican League. After the cancellation of the 2020 LMB season as a result of the COVID-19 pandemic, Barrett signed on to play for the Sugar Land Skeeters of the Constellation Energy League (a makeshift 4-team independent league created as a result of the pandemic) for the 2020 season.

References

External links

1991 births
Living people
Acereros de Monclova players
American expatriate baseball players in Mexico
Arizona Diamondbacks players
Arizona State Sun Devils baseball players
Baseball players at the 2015 Pan American Games
Baseball players from Arizona
Brewster Whitecaps players
Major League Baseball pitchers
Mobile BayBears players
New York Yankees players
Pan American Games silver medalists for the United States
Pan American Games medalists in baseball
Reno Aces players
Salt River Rafters players
Scranton/Wilkes-Barre RailRiders players
South Bend Silver Hawks players
Sportspeople from Mesa, Arizona
Visalia Rawhide players
United States national baseball team players
Medalists at the 2015 Pan American Games